Shoja Rural District is in the Central District of Jolfa County, East Azerbaijan province, Iran. At the National Census of 2006, its population was 4,499 in 1,219 households. There were 4,744 inhabitants in 1,446 households at the following census of 2011. At the most recent census of 2016, the population of the rural district was 4,036 in 1,339 households. The largest of its 15 villages was Shoja, with 2,538 people.

References 

Jolfa County

Rural Districts of East Azerbaijan Province

Populated places in East Azerbaijan Province

Populated places in Jolfa County